Karl Mikael Karlsson (born 21 August 1973), who rides under the name Mikael Max, is an international motorcycle speedway rider who rode in the UK for the Wolverhampton Wolves in the Elite League.

After first riding a speedway bike at the age of twelve, he moved up to 500cc bikes in 1989. He represented Sweden at under-21 level in 1990, and made his full debut for Sweden in 1991. He won the Swedish Under-21 Championship in 1992 and the World Under-21 Championship in 1994. He made his British speedway debut in 1993 for Wolverhampton Wolves, going on to ride for the club until 2005, only missing the 1995 and 2000 seasons. In 2006 he rode for the Arena Essex Hammers. Max is his mother's maiden name and he has raced as Mikael Max since 2003.

His two brothers, Peter Karlsson and Magnus Karlsson, are both motorcycle speedway riders. All three brothers represented Sweden in the 2007 Speedway World Cup, with Magnus riding at reserve.

He won the Swedish Pairs Championship four times, twice with brother Peter, in 1992 and 1996, with Stefan Dannö in 2002 and with Stefan Andersson in 2003.

Speedway Grand Prix results

See also
 Sweden national speedway team
 List of Speedway Grand Prix riders

References

External links
 Official Website

People from Gullspång Municipality
1973 births
Living people
Swedish speedway riders
Speedway World Cup champions
Wolverhampton Wolves riders
Lakeside Hammers riders
Sportspeople from Västra Götaland County